Kurdish is a language or a group of languages spoken by Kurds in the geo-cultural region of Kurdistan and the Kurdish diaspora. Kurdish constitutes a dialect continuum, belonging to Western Iranian languages in the Indo-European language family. The main three dialects or languages of Kurdish are Northern Kurdish, Central Kurdish, and Southern Kurdish.

A separate group of non-Kurdish Northwestern Iranian languages, the Zaza–Gorani languages, are also spoken by several million ethnic Kurds. The majority of the Kurds speak Kurmanji, and most Kurdish texts are written in Kurmanji and Sorani. Kurmanji is written in the Hawar alphabet, a derivation of the Latin script, and Sorani is written in the Sorani alphabet, a derivation of Arabic script.

The classification of Laki as a dialect of Southern Kurdish or as a fourth language under Kurdish is a matter of debate, but the differences between Laki and other Southern Kurdish dialects are minimal.

The literary output in Kurdish was mostly confined to poetry until the early 20th century, when more general literature became developed. Today, the two principal written Kurdish dialects are Kurmanji and Sorani. Sorani is, along with Arabic, one of the two official languages of Iraq and is in political documents simply referred to as "Kurdish".

Classification and origin
The Kurdish languages belong to the Iranian branch of the Indo-European family. They are generally classified as Northwestern Iranian languages, or by some scholars as intermediate between Northwestern and Southwestern Iranian. Martin van Bruinessen notes that "Kurdish has a strong South-Western Iranian element", whereas "Zaza and Gurani [...] do belong to the north-west Iranian group".

Ludwig Paul concludes that Kurdish seems to be a Northwestern Iranian language in origin, but acknowledges that it shares many traits with Southwestern Iranian languages like Persian, apparently due to longstanding and intense historical contacts.

Windfuhr identified Kurdish dialects as Parthian, albeit with a Median substratum. Windfuhr and Frye assume an eastern origin for Kurdish and consider it as related to eastern and central Iranian dialects.

The present state of knowledge about Kurdish allows, at least roughly, drawing the approximate borders of the areas where the main ethnic core of the speakers of the contemporary Kurdish dialects was formed. The most argued hypothesis on the localisation of the ethnic territory of the Kurds remains D.N. Mackenzie's theory, proposed in the early 1960s (Mackenzie 1961). Developing the ideas of P. Tedesco (1921: 255) and regarding the common phonetic isoglosses shared by Kurdish, Persian, and Baluchi, Mackenzie concluded that the speakers of these three languages may once have been in closer contact.

Subdivisions
Kurdish is divided into three or four groups, where dialects from different groups are not mutually intelligible without acquired bilingualism.

Kurmanji is the largest dialect group, spoken by an estimated 15 to 20 million Kurds in Turkey, Syria, northern Iraq, and northwest and northeast Iran.
Sorani is spoken by an estimated 6 to 7 million Kurds in much of Iraqi Kurdistan and the Iranian Kurdistan Province. Sorani is a written standard of Central Kurdish developed in the 1920s (named after the historical Soran Emirate) and was later adopted as the standard orthography of Kurdish as an official language of Iraq.
Southern Kurdish (Pehlewani) is spoken in the Kermanshah, Ilam and Lorestan provinces of Iran and in the Khanaqin District of eastern Iraq. Laki and Kordali (Palai) are often included in Southern Kurdish, but they have some distinct features.

In historical evolution terms, Kurmanji is less modified than Sorani and Pehlewani in both phonetic and morphological structure. The Sorani group has been influenced by among other things its closer cultural proximity to the other languages spoken by Kurds in the region including the Gorani language in parts of Iranian Kurdistan and Iraqi Kurdistan.

Philip G. Kreyenbroek, an expert writing in 1992, says:

According to Encyclopaedia of Islam, although Kurdish is not a unified language, its many dialects are interrelated and at the same time distinguishable from other Western Iranian languages. The same source classifies different Kurdish dialects as two main groups, northern and central. The reality is that the average Kurmanji speaker does not find it easy to communicate with the inhabitants of Sulaymaniyah or Halabja.

Some linguistic scholars assert that the term "Kurdish" has been applied extrinsically in describing the language the Kurds speak, whereas some ethnic Kurds have used the word term to simply describe their ethnicity and refer to their language as Kurmanji, Sorani, Hewrami, Kermanshahi, Kalhori or whatever other dialect or language they speak. Some historians have noted that it is only recently that the Kurds who speak the Sorani dialect have begun referring to their language as Kurdî, in addition to their identity, which is translated to simply mean Kurdish.

The Mokriani variety of Sorani is widely spoken in Mokrian. Piranshahr and Mahabad are two principal cities of the Mokrian area.

Zazaki and Gorani

Zaza–Gorani languages, which are spoken by communities in the wider area who identify as ethnic Kurds, are not linguistically classified as Kurdish. Zaza-Gorani is classified as adjunct to Kurdish, although authorities differ in the details. groups Kurdish with Zaza Gorani within a "Northwestern I" group, while Glottolog based on Encyclopædia Iranica prefers an areal grouping of "Central dialects" (or "Kermanic") within Northwest Iranic, with Kurdish but not Zaza-Gorani grouped with "Kermanic".

Gorani is distinct from Northern and Central Kurdish, yet shares vocabulary with both of them and there are some grammatical similarities with Central Kurdish. The Hawrami dialects of Gorani includes a variety that was an important literary language since the 14th century, but it was replaced by Central Kurdish in the 20th century.

European scholars have maintained that Gorani is separate from Kurdish and that Kurdish is synonymous with the Northern Kurdish group, whereas ethnic Kurds maintain that Kurdish encompasses any of the unique languages or dialects spoken by Kurds that are not spoken by neighbouring ethnic groups.

Gorani is classified as part of the Zaza–Gorani branch of Indo-Iranian languages. The Zaza language, spoken mainly in Turkey, differs both grammatically and in vocabulary and is generally not understandable by Gorani speakers but it is considered related to Gorani. Almost all Zaza-speaking communities, as well as speakers of the closely related Shabaki dialect spoken in parts of Iraqi Kurdistan, identify themselves as ethnic Kurds.

Geoffrey Haig and Ergin Öpengin in their recent study suggest grouping the Kurdish languages into Northern Kurdish, Central Kurdish, Southern Kurdish, Zaza, and Gorani, and avoid the subgrouping Zaza–Gorani.

The notable professor Zare Yusupova has carried out a lot of work and research into the Gorani dialect (as well as many other minority/ancient Kurdish dialects).

History

During his stay in Damascus, historian Ibn Wahshiyya came across two books on agriculture written in Kurdish, one on the culture of the vine and the palm tree, and the other on water and the means of finding it out in unknown ground. He translated both from Kurdish into Arabic in the early 9th century AD.

Among the earliest Kurdish religious texts is the Yazidi Black Book, the sacred book of Yazidi faith. It is considered to have been authored sometime in the 13th century AD by Hassan bin Adi (b. 1195 AD), the great-grandnephew of Sheikh Adi ibn Musafir (d. 1162), the founder of the faith. It contains the Yazidi account of the creation of the world, the origin of man, the story of Adam and Eve and the major prohibitions of the faith. From the 15th to 17th centuries, classical Kurdish poets and writers developed a literary language. The most notable classical Kurdish poets from this period were Ali Hariri, Ahmad Khani, Malaye Jaziri and Faqi Tayran.

The Italian priest Maurizio Garzoni published the first Kurdish grammar titled Grammatica e Vocabolario della Lingua Kurda in Rome in 1787 after eighteen years of missionary work among the Kurds of Amadiya. This work is very important in Kurdish history as it is the first acknowledgment of the widespread use of a distinctive Kurdish language. Garzoni was given the title Father of Kurdology by later scholars. The Kurdish language was banned in a large portion of Kurdistan for some time. After the 1980 Turkish coup d'état until 1991 the use of the Kurdish language was illegal in Turkey.

Current status

Today, Sorani is an official language in Iraq. In Syria, on the other hand, publishing materials in Kurdish is forbidden, though this prohibition is not enforced any more due to the Syrian civil war.

Before August 2002, the Turkish government placed severe restrictions on the use of Kurdish, prohibiting the language in education and broadcast media. In March 2006, Turkey allowed private television channels to begin airing programming in Kurdish. However, the Turkish government said that they must avoid showing children's cartoons, or educational programs that teach Kurdish, and could broadcast only for 45 minutes a day or four hours a week. The state-run Turkish Radio and Television Corporation (TRT) started its 24-hour Kurdish television station on 1 January 2009 with the motto "we live under the same sky". The Turkish prime minister sent a video message in Kurdish to the opening ceremony, which was attended by Minister of Culture and other state officials. The channel uses the X, W, and Q letters during broadcasting. However, most of these restrictions on private Kurdish television channels were relaxed in September 2009. In 2010, Kurdish municipalities in the southeast began printing marriage certificates, water bills, construction and road signs, as well as emergency, social and cultural notices in Kurdish alongside Turkish. Also Imams began to deliver Friday sermons in Kurdish and Esnaf price tags in Kurdish. Many mayors were tried for issuing public documents in Kurdish language. The Kurdish alphabet is not recognized in Turkey, and prior to 2013 the use of Kurdish names containing the letters X, W, and Q, which do not exist in the Turkish alphabet, was not allowed. In 2012, Kurdish-language lessons became an elective subject in public schools. Previously, Kurdish education had only been possible in private institutions.

In Iran, though it is used in some local media and newspapers, it is not used in public schools. In 2005, 80 Iranian Kurds took part in an experiment and gained scholarships to study in Kurdish in Iraqi Kurdistan.

In Kyrgyzstan,  of the Kurdish population speak Kurdish as their native language. In Kazakhstan, the corresponding percentage is 88.7%.

Phonology

Grammar

Writing system

The Kurdish language has been written using four different writing systems. In Iraq and Iran it is written using an Arabic script, composed by Sa'id Kaban Sedqi. More recently, it is sometimes written with a Latin alphabet in Iraq. In Turkey, Syria, and Armenia, it is now written using a Latin script. Kurdish was also written in the Arabic script in Turkey and Syria until 1932. There is a proposal for a unified international recognized Kurdish alphabet based on ISO-8859-1 called Yekgirtú. Kurdish in the former USSR is written with a Cyrillic alphabet. Kurdish has even been written in the Armenian alphabet in Soviet Armenia and in the Ottoman Empire (a translation of the Gospels in 1857 and of all New Testament in 1872).

See also

 Kurdish people
 Kurdish culture
 Kurdish literature
 Kurdish Wikipedia
 Kurdish Institute of Paris
 Kurdish Institute of Istanbul
 List of countries by Kurdish-speaking population

Notes

References

External links

 Wîkîferheng  (Kurdish Wiktionary)
 VejinBooks, collection of Kurdish literary and historical texts
 Vejin Dictionaries, collection of Kurdish dictionaries (written in Arabic script)
 The Kurdish Academy of Language (unofficial)
 Kurdînûs, a tool for writing in Kurdish and to convert texts from Arabic script to Latin script and vice versa
 Egerîn, Kurdish (Kurmanji) search engine
 inKurdish: English–Kurdish Translation
 Dictio: English–Kurdish (Sorani) Dictionary
 The Kurdish Institute of Paris: Language and Literature
 Kurdish Language and Linguistics, at Encyclopedia Iranica (article written by Ludwig Paul)
 Reference Grammar with Selected Readings both for Sorani and Kurmanji, written by W. M. Thackston (Harvard University)
 History of Kurdish Written Literature, at Encyclopedia Iranica (article written by Philip G. Kryeenbroek)
 Kurdish Language Initiative of Seywan Institute
 Kurdish Institute of Istanbul
 KAL: The Kurdish Academy of Language
 
 Grammar of a Less Familiar Language (MIT OpenCourseWare)
 Southern Kurdish phonetic
 Gorani Influence on Central Kurdish
 

Languages of Armenia
Languages of Azerbaijan
Languages of Turkey
Languages of Iran
Languages of Iraq
Languages of Israel
Languages of Lebanon
Languages of Syria
Subject–object–verb languages
Iranian languages
Articles citing Nationalencyklopedin
Languages of Kurdistan